"I'm So Crazy" is a song by Italian electronic duo Par-T-One and Australian rock group INXS. It is a remixed version of the INXS song "Just Keep Walking".

The music video depicts people doing the pogo move, and Michael Hutchence's vocal style resembling a skinhead. It was directed by Sam Brown and Paul Gore, who had later success directing videos for James Blunt and the Bravery. The video was nominated for various awards in the short film and best promo video categories.

The song contains samples of Dennis Parker's "Like an Eagle" and "I'm So in Love".

The single reached No. 19 on the UK Singles Chart.

Track listing
"I'm So Crazy" (Radio Edit)
"I'm So Crazy" (Original Version)
"I'm So Crazy" (Erick Morillo vs Who the Funk / Harry 'Choo Choo' Romero Mix)
"I'm So Crazy" (Crazy Guitar Mix)

Charts

References

2001 songs
2001 singles
INXS songs
Songs written by Andrew Farriss
Songs written by Michael Hutchence
Mercury Records singles